The Alexander von Humboldt statue is a monumental statue of Alexander von Humboldt in Philadelphia, Pennsylvania, United States. Located in Fairmount Park, the statue was completed in 1871 and donated to the city in 1876.

History 
Alexander von Humboldt was a Prussian polymath active during the late 18th and early 19th centuries. In May 1804, on the last stage of his scientific journey through the Americas, he visited Philadelphia. On September 13, 1869, on the centennial anniversary of Humboldt's birth, the cornerstone for a monument honoring him was laid in Fairmount Park, on a knoll overlooking the Girard Avenue Bridge, by the city's German society. The statue on Humboldt was designed by Friedrich Drake, a German sculptor based in Berlin. It was dedicated in 1871. Several years later, in 1876, on the centennial of American independence, the statue was gifted to the city of Philadelphia and dedicated again. According to the Association for Public Art, the statue was moved to another part of the park in 1977.

Design 
The monument consists of a bronze sculpture of Humboldt placed on a granite socle. Humboldt is wearing a long coat, with his left hand on a globe. In his right hand is a scroll with "COSMOS" written on it.

See also 

 1871 in art

References

Bibliography 

 
 Andreas W. Daum, "Nation, Naturforschung und Monument: Humboldt-Denkmäler in Deutschland und den USA"  [Humboldt monuments in Germany and the US]. Die Kunst der Geschichte: Historiographie, Ästhetik, Erzählung, ed. Martin Baumeister et al. Göttingen: Vandenhoeck & Ruprecht, 2009, 99‒124.

External links 
 
 

1871 establishments in Pennsylvania
1871 sculptures
Alexander von Humboldt
Bronze sculptures in Pennsylvania
Monuments and memorials in Philadelphia
Outdoor sculptures in Philadelphia
Sculptures of men in Pennsylvania
Statues in Pennsylvania